Shawn G. Gibbs is an American industrial hygienist. , he is the dean of the Texas A&M School of Public Health.

Early life and education
Gibbs graduated from Ohio State University with a Bachelor of Science degree in biology, becoming the first person in his family to graduate from college. Following this, he accepted a contractor position with the United States Environmental Protection Agency which led him to pursuing a master's degree and PhD at the University of Cincinnati.

Career
Gibbs began his academic career at the University of Texas Health Science Center at Houston as the co-director of two Cores of the Hispanic Health Disparities Research Center. While there, he was awarded a 2006 Fulbright Scholarship to conduct research in the Air Pollution Department of the National Research Center in Giza. Following this, Gibbs accepted an associate professor position in the department of environmental, agricultural, and occupational health at the University of Nebraska Medical Center (UNMC) in 2008.

During his tenure at UMNC, Gibbs became a certified industrial hygienist with the American Board of Industrial Hygiene and served as the Associate Dean for Student Affairs in their College of Public Health. He was shortly thereafter promoted to Director of Research in the Nebraska Biocontainment Unit (NBU) during the Western African Ebola virus epidemic. In this role, he helped determine policies, procedures, and best practices to treat patients with the disease. Gibbs eventually left UMNC to become the Executive Associate Dean of the School of Public Health at Indiana University.

In March 2020, Gibbs was announced as the dean of the Texas A&M School of Public Health effective May 1, 2020. As a result of his public health background, Gibbs was invited to join the Southeastern Conference Medical Task Force for COVID-19  where he developed a multi-pronged approach aimed at reducing the spread of the virus on campus. By December 2020, Gibbs was appointed to lead the Texas A&M's COVID-19 response. As the pandemic continued, Gibbs also sat on the SEC's Return to Activity and Medical Guidance Task Force which was recognized with the Michael L. Slive Distinguished Service Award for their leadership and significant impact to the betterment of the mission of the conference.

Personal life
Gibbs is married.

References

Living people
Hygienists
Texas A&M University faculty
Indiana University faculty
University of Nebraska Medical Center faculty
University of Texas Health Science Center at Houston faculty
University of Nebraska alumni
Ohio State University alumni
University of Cincinnati alumni
Year of birth missing (living people)